Tiruchirapalli West Taluk is a taluk of Tiruchirapalli district of the Indian state of Tamil Nadu. It was formed in 2013 when the Tiruchirappalli taluk was bifurcated into Tiruchirappalli East and Tiruchirappalli West. Wards 39 to 42 and 44 to 60 fall under the jurisdiction of the Taluk.

Demographics
It had a literacy rate of 82.77%.

References 

Taluks of Tiruchirapalli district